Nengren Temple is a Buddhist temple located in Xunyang District of Jiujiang, Jiangxi, China. Nengren Temple is one of the "Three Buddhist Temples of Jiujiang". It has been authorized as a National Key Buddhist Temple in Han Chinese Area by the State Council of China in 1983. Nengren Temple was first built in the Northern and Southern dynasties (420–589), and went through many changes and repairs through the following dynasties. The modern temple was founded in 1870 in the Tongzhi period of the Qing dynasty (1644–1911).

History

Liang and Tang dynasties
Nengren Temple was first built between 502 and 549 during the reign of Emperor Wu of Liang of Liang dynasty (502–557), rebuilt in the Dali period (766–779) of Tang dynasty, and initially called "Chengtian Temple".

Song dynasty
The temple had reached unprecedented heyday in the reign of Emperor Renzong (1041–1048) of the Northern Song dynasty (960–1127), while monk Baiyunduan resided in the temple chanting and practicing scriptures, and attracted large numbers of practitioners.

Yuan dynasty
In 1352, in the 12th year of Zhizheng period (1341–1370) in the Yuan dynasty (1271–1368), the temple was completely destroyed by war.

Ming dynasty
In 1379, at the dawn of Ming dynasty (1368–1644), the local government rebuilt the temple. In 1498, in the 2nd year of Hongzhi era, the temple was renamed "Nengren Temple". In 1573 during the reign of Wanli Emperor, the Buddhist Texts Library was added to the temple.

Qing dynasty
In the Qianlong period (1736–1796) of the Qing dynasty (1644–1911), the emperor bestowed a set of Tripitakas on the temple. During the Xianfeng period (1851–1861), it became deserted and restored in the Tongzhi period (1862–1874).

People's Republic of China
In July 1957, the Jiangxi People's Provincial Government classified the temple as a provincial level key cultural heritage.

In 1983, Nengren Temple was designated as a National Key Buddhist Temple in Han Chinese Area by the State Council of China.

Architecture

Nengren Temple is built along the up and down of mountains and divided into the front, middle and end routes. The central axis of the complex are the Shanmen, Shuangyang Bridge, Mahavira Hall, Iron Buddha Hall, and Buddhist Texts Library.

Mahavira Hall
The Mahavira Hall is the main hall of Nengren Temple enshrining Sakyamuni. Statues of Kassapa and Ananda are placed on the left and right sides of his statue. The statues of Eighteen Arhats stand on both sides of the hall.

Dasheng Pagoda
The Dasheng Pagoda was first built in 766 and rebuilt in 1379.

Stone Boat
The Stone Boat was made in 1406 in the Qingli period of Northern Song dynasty (960–1127). During the Yuanyou period (1086–1094), an iron Buddha was cast and placed on the boat. Legend says that in the Northern Song dynasty a monk dreamed about an iron Buddha ferrying across the river in a stone boat. In the Cultural Revolution, the Iron Buddha was demolished by the Red Guards.

Shuangyang Bridge
The marble three-arch Shuangyang Bridge was built in the Yuanyou period (1086–1094) of the Northern Song dynasty (960–1127), its banisters were engraved patterns of various flying phoenixes, lotuses, Hercules, monsters, etc.

References

Bibliography
 

Buddhist temples in Jiangxi
Buildings and structures in Jiujiang
Tourist attractions in Jiujiang
19th-century establishments in China
19th-century Buddhist temples
Religious buildings and structures completed in 1870